Ban Luang is a district (amphoe) in the western part of Nan province, northern Thailand.

History
Originally the area was Tambon Suat of Mueang Nan district. It was created as Ban Luang Minor District (king amphoe) on 15 May 1975, when three tambons, Pa Kha Luang, Suat, and Ban Phi, were split off from Mueang District. It was upgraded to a full district on 20 October 1993.

Geography
Neighboring districts are from the east clockwise Mueang Nan, Wiang Sa of Nan Province, Song of Phrae province, Chiang Muan and Pong of Phayao province.

Administration
The district is divided into four sub-districts (tambons) which are further subdivided into 26 villages (mubans). There are no municipal (thesaban) areas, and four tambon administrative organizations (TAO).

References

External links
amphoe.com

Ban Luang